Chatsworth is a city in and the county seat of Murray County, Georgia, United States. It is part of the Dalton, Georgia, Metropolitan Statistical Area. Its population was 4,874 at the 2020 census, up from 4,299 in 2010. The city is the site of the coldest recorded temperature in Georgia,  on January 27, 1940.

According to a popular legend, the town received its name after a road sign with the word "Chatsworth" fell off a passing freight train nearby. Someone put the sign on a post, and the name stuck.

History
Chatsworth was founded in 1905 as a depot on the Louisville and Nashville Railroad. It was incorporated as a town in 1906 and as a city in 1923. In 1915, the seat of Murray County transferred to Chatsworth from Spring Place.

Geography
Chatsworth is located in central Murray County at  (34.772336, -84.778977), in northwestern Georgia.

U.S. Routes 76 and 411 pass through the center of town on Third Avenue.

Holly Creek, which runs along the eastern edge of the city, is a south- and west-flowing tributary of the Conasauga River, part of the Oostanaula/Coosa/Alabama River watershed.

Demographics

2020 census

As of the 2020 United States census, there were 4,874 people, 1,670 households, and 1,117 families residing in the city.

2010 census
As of the census of 2010, there were 4,299 people, 1,587 households, and 1,071 families residing in the city. The racial makeup of the city was 99.1% White, 0.5% African American, 0.1% Native American, 0.1% Asian, 0.2% Pacific Islander, 0% from other races, and 0% from two or more races. Hispanic or Latino of any race were 0% of the population.

Education

Murray County School District 
The Murray County School District holds preschool to grade twelve, and consists of six elementary schools, two middle schools, two high schools, and once had an academy school which became another high school.  The district has 451 full-time teachers and over 7,350 students.

Notable people 
C. K. Fauver, former Major League Baseball pitcher for the Louisville Colonels
Ladd McConkey, wide receiver for the Georgia Bulldogs
Billy Napier, football coach for the Florida Gators
Jody Ridley, NASCAR driver
Robert L. Vining Jr., former senior United States district judge

References

External links

 

Cities in Georgia (U.S. state)
Cities in Murray County, Georgia
County seats in Georgia (U.S. state)
Dalton metropolitan area, Georgia
Populated places established in 1905
1905 establishments in Georgia (U.S. state)